Hunter Valentine EP was an E.P. by the Canadian band Hunter Valentine released in 2005.

Track listing
"Break this"
"Fight"
"Van City"
"Rotting Love Guts"

External links
Hunter Valentine at Sonicbids

2005 EPs
Hunter Valentine albums
True North Records albums